Tuesday, After Christmas is a 2010 Romanian film written and directed by Radu Muntean. The film was selected for the Un Certain Regard section of 2010 Cannes Film Festival.

Plot
Paul, a banker in Bucharest, has been married for ten years to Adriana and they have an adored daughter Mara. The child has tooth problems which are being tended by Raluca, an attractive young orthodontist. Since first seeing her in the summer, Paul has been having a secret affair with Raluca. But, as Christmas approaches, tensions mount. While Paul loves both women, Raluca tells him what he already knows: that he must choose. When he says to his wife that he is in love with Raluca, she orders him to move out and to say nothing to Mara. The round of Christmas festivities then begins, with the couple pretending outwardly that nothing is wrong. Action is postponed until the Tuesday after Christmas.

Cast
 Maria Popistașu as Raluca
 Mimi Brănescu as Paul Hanganu
  as Adriana Hanganu
 Dragoș Bucur as Cristi
 Victor Rebengiuc as Nucu

Reception

Awards and nominations
Leeds International Film Festival
Won: Golden Owl Award

See also
 Romanian New Wave

References

External links
 
 

2010 films
Films directed by Radu Muntean
Romanian romantic drama films
2010s Romanian-language films
Films set in Bucharest
2010s erotic films